The Kyneton Football Netball Club, nicknamed the Tigers, is an Australian rules football and netball club based in the town of Kyneton, Victoria. Kyneton teams currently compete in the Bendigo Football Netball League. The football squad has played there since 1932.

History 
It has been said that Kyneton was the Victorian town where the first organised regional football match was contested, although other records indicate that a game was played at Castlemaine in June 1859. The first match in Kyneton was held in the early 1860s, with 84 players (42 by side) on the field. The match was played at the Showgrounds Oval

As a formal competition was established in Kyneton in 1868, with Ballarat's starting in 1869 and Castlemaine's in 1871, being the first competitions in the region until the Victorian Football League was founded in 1877.

The club went into recess in 2013 citing a player shortage, but returned to the competition in 2014.

Premierships
Senior Football
Bendigo Football League 
(6): 1936, 1960, 1961, 1966, 1995, 1997

Notable players 
The following Kyneton players have played senior VFL / AFL football.
1922 - Horrie Mason (St Kilda Best and Fairest winner in 1926)
1922 - Leo Wescott (Collingwood premiership player 1927 & 1929)
1958 - Bill Arch (Carlton wing)
1976 - Jim Buckley (Carlton premiership player 1979, 1981 & 1982)
1998 - Nathan Thompson (Hawthorn and North Melbourne full-forward)
2009 - Rhys Magin (Essendon forward)

Bibliography
 History of Football in the Bendigo District - John Stoward -

Notes

References

External links

 Official website

Australian rules football clubs in Victoria (Australia)
Sports clubs established in 1868
Australian rules football clubs established in 1868
1868 establishments in Australia
Kyneton, Victoria
Netball teams in Victoria (Australia)